Tony Bird may refer to:
Tony Bird (singer-songwriter) (1945–2019), folk rock singer-songwriter
Tony Bird (footballer, born 1910), who played for Plymouth Argyle and Newport County
Tony Bird (footballer, born 1974), who played for Cardiff City and Swansea City

See also
Anthony Bird (1931–2016), British Anglican priest, physician and academic